India–Morocco relations are the bilateral ties between Morocco and India.  Morocco has an embassy in New Delhi, and Consulates in Mumbai and Kolkata. India operates an embassy in Rabat. Both nations are part of the Non-Aligned Movement.

In the United Nations, India supported the decolonisation of Morocco and the Moroccan freedom movement. India recognised Morocco on June 20, 1956 and established relations in 1957. The Ministry of External Affairs of the Government of India states that "India and Morocco have enjoyed cordial and friendly relations and over the years bilateral relations have witnessed significant depth and growth."

Historical 
Arab Explorer Ibn Battuta from Tangier, Morocco visited Delhi in early 1300s where he was made judge by the Sultan of Delhi Muhammad Bin Tughlaq.

Exchanges and Trade relations
India was Morocco's 4th largest trading partner 13th largest supplier in the first half of 2021.

A high-level Moroccan trade delegation led by Ambassador Mohamed Maliki visited India on a six-day visit in November 2021. Maliki declared that the country had a national plan to increase their presence in India. He also announced that the country would open a consulate in Bangalore.

The Indian Council for Cultural Relations promotes Indian culture in Morocco. Morocco seeks to increase its trade ties with India and is seeking Indian investment in various sectors

Indian Embassy 
The Indian embassy is located in Rabat.

 Ambassador Shri Rajesh Vaishnaw

Moroccan Embassy 
The Moroccan embassy is located in New Delhi.

 Ambassador Mohamed Maliki

See also
 Ibn Battuta, Muslim jurist and traveler from Morocco who served as a qazi in the Delhi Sultanate and as its ambassador to China.
 Nora Fatehi, Bollywood actress of Moroccan origin.

References

 
Bilateral relations of Morocco
Morocco
Morocco